The Atlantic Ballet Theatre of Canada is a professional award-winning touring ballet company based in Moncton, New Brunswick. Founded in 2002 by Susan Chalmers-Gauvin, CEO, and Artistic Director Igor Dobrovolskiy, Ballet-théâtre atlantique du Canada/ The Atlantic Ballet Theatre Of Canada presents a diverse collection of original full-length narrative ballets and short works which explore contemporary themes within the classical genre. Each work is conceived and choreographed by Dobrovolskiy.

Ballet-théâtre atlantique du Canada/ The Atlantic Ballet Theatre of Canada, is Atlantic Canada's only professional ballet company, and the artists of the Company are classically trained soloists from Canada and around the world.

Dobrovolskiy is a graduate of the Kyiv State Ballet Academy and earned a Bachelor of Fine Arts in pedagogy of ballet dance and choreography from the Kyiv National University of the Arts. He began his professional dance career with the State Theatre of Opera and Ballet for Children and Youth in Kyiv, Ukraine. His vocation has taken him across Europe, to Ecuador and finally to the Atlantic Ballet Theatre of Canada.

ABTC's/ BTAC's world premiere was held at the Capitol Theater in Moncton, it was a rendition of Figaro. 
The Company serves the four eastern provinces of Canada and is the only dance company in Canada with a four Province home constituency: New Brunswick, Prince Edward Island, Nova Scotia and Newfoundland and Labrador and is a major cultural institution for its home region.
They have also played many national and international shows touring to United States of America, Germany, France and around Europe. They began their 'InTENse' tour at the beginning of 2011 in celebration of their 10th anniversary. In Tense is a show case for the Company and also an opportunity for Company artists to create. Dancers who have contributed and choreographed for Intense include: Leigh Alderson, Kyle Davey and Janie Richard.

The Beethoven Festival
In 2010 the company were asked to premier their new ballet Fidelio on September 11 in Bonn, Germany at the beginning of The Beethoven Festival, where they performed their Beethoven Opera inspired ballet to packed audiences accompanied by the 106-piece Beethoven Orchestra. The ballet was received with a positive reaction from both the audiences and critics alike.

Ghosts Of Violence
The Ghosts of Violence ballet was the result of a creative collaboration between Dobrovolskiy and Sharon Pollock. Ghosts of Violence, was inspired by the stories of women who lost their lives at the hands of an intimate partner. Innovative and poignant and controversial to call for awareness, understanding and action. The ballet captured the memory of these silent victims and told their stories of struggle, hope, and our loss. The ballet will help raise public awareness on the devastating impact of domestic violence.

The creation of the ballet was supported in part by: The Government of Canada, Status of Women Canada, Atlantic Canada Opportunities Agency and The Canada Council of the Arts. In 2012, the Transition House Association of Nova Scotia, the World YWCA, Family SOS, Silent Witness Nova Scotia, and Leave Out Violence partnered together to host Ghosts of Violence in Halifax.

Awards
The Atlantic Ballet Theatre of Canada won the Greater Moncton Chamber of Commerce Business Excellence Award (Prix D' Excellence) in 2006 and the Chamber's Export Success Award in 2007.

Repertoire

Over the company's ten years of touring and performing, Dobrovolskiy has created most of the company's repertoire which has garnered good reviews. In 2010, dancer Leigh Alderson created a new work for the company for the Grant Thornton Gala held at the Capitiol Theatre, Moncton, NB.

Previous full length repertoire includes;

GHOSTS OF VIOLENCE
 
World Premiere- February 15, 2011, Ottawa, Canada
Choreography- Igor Dobrovolskiy
Music: – Alfred Schnittke, Sergei Rachmaninoff
Lighting Design- Pierre Lavoie
Costume Design- Denis Lavoie
Set Design- Brian Perchaluk
Projection design- Adam Larsen
 
FIDELIO
 
World Premiere-September 11, 2010, CO-PRODUCTION Theatre Bonn, Germany
Music: Ludwig van Beethoven
Lighting Design: Pierre Lavoie
Costume Design: Denis Lavoie
Set Design: Brian Perchaluk
 
ROMEO AND JULIET FANTASY
 
World Premiere-February 22, 2010 Boca Raton Florida
A ballet in one act
Music: Pyotr Ilyich Tchaikovsky
Lighting Design: Pierre Lavoie
Costume Design: Igor Dobrovolskiy
Set Design: Igor Dobrovolskiy
 
FLEETING
 
World Premiere-World Premiere October 7, 2009, Moncton, New Brunswick
Music: J. S Bach
Lighting Design: Pierre Lavoie
Costume Design: Igor Dobrovolskiy
 
KING LEAR
 
World Premier-October 10, 2008, Moncton New Brunswick
Music: Dimitri Shostakovich
Dramaturge: Sharon Pollock
Costume Design: Denis Lavoie
Lighting Design Pierre Lavoie
 
DON JUAN
 
World Premiere- October 12, 2007, Moncton New Brunswick
Music: George Gershwin
Dramaturge: Sharon Pollock
Costume Design: Denis Lavoie
Lighting Design Pierre Lavoie
 
PHANTOM OF THE OPERA
 
World Premiere-October 6, 2006, Moncton New Brunswick
Music: François Poulenc
Dramaturge: Sharon Pollock
Set: Brian Perchaluk
Costume: Paul Daigle
Lighting: Denis Lavoie
 
AMADEUS
 
World Premiere – September 23, 2005 Moncton, New Brunswick
Music: W.A. Mozart, A. Salieri
Set and Costume Design: Michael Eagan
Lighting Design: Pierre Lavoie
 
LES PORTES TOURNANTES
 
World Premiere, November 19, 2004 Moncton, New Brunswick
Music: F. Dompierre
Set and Costume Design: Michael Eagan
Lighting: Julia Vandergraaf
 
MERLIN
 
World Premiere – October 25, 2003 Moncton, New Brunswick
Music: G. Mahler
Set Design: Darcy Poultney
Costume Design: Paul Daigle
 
FIGARO
 
World Premiere – May 11, 2002  Moncton, New Brunswick
Music: W.A. Mozart
Set and Costume Design: Paul Daigle

Short Works

In 'D' Trois (August 2010)
Glass Work (World Premiere November 12, 2010) [ch: Leigh Alderson]
Sonata For Two (World Premiere November 12, 2010)
Perpetual Motion (World Premiere November 12, 2010)
Suspiro (World Premiere May 11, 2011) [ch: Kyle Davey & Janie Richard]

Dancers

The company is renowned for the high standard of its international dancers, coming from the Ukraine, Australia, Japan, Northern Ireland, UK and Canada.
As of 2010 the company consisted of:
LEADERSHIP
Artistic Director/Principal Choreographer: Igor Dobrovolskiy,
CEO: Susan Chalmers-Gauvin

ADMINISTRATION
Director of Marketing: Steve Smith
Director of Fund Development: David Beckerson
Operations and Community Relations Manager: Louis Philippe-Dionne
Accounting: Michel Goguen

PRODUCTION
Technical Director: Shawn Donellson
Production Stage Manager: Yee-Hang Yam
Lighting/Electricien: Daniel McIImoyl

Dancers:                                                                                                                                                                                                                                       Eldiyar Daniyarov ( 2012–Present ) 
Leigh Alderson (2010–2013)
Kyle Davey (2010–2012)
Sergiy Diyanov(2003–Present)
Yuriko Diyanova (2003–Present)
Anton Lykhanov (2007–2012)
Anya Nesvitaylo(2006–Present)
Janie Richard (2010–2013)
Evelina Sushko(2003–2011)
Olena Zakharova (2007–Present)
Louis-Philippe Dionne (2005–2012)
Samantha Jane Gray (2011–2013)
Lucy Lowndes (2011)
Brian Gephart(2011–2013)

References

External links
 Home Page

Culture of Moncton
Companies based in Moncton
Ballet companies in Canada
2002 establishments in New Brunswick
Performing groups established in 2002
Touring performing arts